Gonda is a constituency of the Uttar Pradesh Legislative Assembly covering the city of Gonda in the Gonda district of Uttar Pradesh, India.

Gonda is one of seven assembly constituencies in the Gonda district. This assembly constituency is numbered 296 amongst 403 constituencies.

Members of the Legislative Assembly (MLA)

Election results

2022

2017
Bharatiya Janta Party candidate Prateek Bhushan Singh won in 2017 Uttar Pradesh Legislative Elections defeating Bahujan Samaj Party candidate Mohd. Jaleel Khan by a margin of 11,678 votes.

References

External link
 

Assembly constituencies of Uttar Pradesh
Gonda, Uttar Pradesh